Jesse James vs. the Daltons is a 1954 American 3-D Western film directed by William Castle and starring Brett King, Barbara Lawrence and James Griffith. It was produced and distributed by Columbia Pictures and was one of three films shot by Castle in 3-D during the 1950s 3-D 'golden era'.

Plot
Joe Branch (Brett King), rumored to be the son of outlaw Jesse James, sets out to contact the infamous Dalton Gang and to learn the truth about his legendary father.

Cast
 Brett King as Joe Branch 
 Barbara Lawrence as Kate Manning 
 James Griffith as Bob Dalton
 William Phipps as Bill Dalton 
 John Cliff as Grat Dalton
 Rory Mallinson as Bob Ford
 William Tannen as Emmett Dalton
 Richard Garland as Gilkie
 Nelson Leigh as Father Kerrigan

References

External links
 
 
 

1954 Western (genre) films
1954 films
1954 3D films
American 3D films
American Western (genre) films
Columbia Pictures films
Dalton Gang
1950s English-language films
1950s American films